The Northwestern State Demons baseball team is a varsity intercollegiate athletic team of Northwestern State University in Natchitoches, Louisiana, United States. The team is a member of the Southland Conference, which is part of the National Collegiate Athletic Association's Division I. The team plays its home games at H. Alvin Brown–C. C. Stroud Field in Natchitoches, Louisiana. The Demons are coached by Bobby Barbier

History

Year-by-year results

Major League Baseball
Northwestern State has had 54 Major League Baseball Draft selections since the draft began in 1965.

See also
List of NCAA Division I baseball programs

References

External links